The Mirambeena Regional Park, within the suburbs of Georges Hall and Lansdowne, is a strip of recreational parks and nature reserves bounded by the Georges River to the West and Henry Lawson Drive to the East.  It consists of the five parks of Garrison Point and Lake Gillawarna in Georges Hall; and Flinders Slopes, Shortland Brush and Lansdowne Reserve in Lansdowne.

External links
 https://web.archive.org/web/20060414122232/http://www.bankstowncity.nsw.gov.au/rec/places/parks.cfm

City of Canterbury-Bankstown